Sphinx asellus, the asellus sphinx moth, is a moth of the family Sphingidae. The species was first described by Walter Rothschild and Karl Jordan in 1903. It is known from pinyon-juniper woodland and similar arid areas in the US states of Colorado, Nevada, Utah, extreme south-western Wyoming, Arizona, New Mexico and south-western Texas.

The wingspan is 80–99 mm. There is one generation per year with adults on wing from May to July.

The larvae feed on manzanita species.

References

External links
"Asella sphinx (Sphinx asella)". Moths of North America. Archived January 22, 2000.

Sphinx (genus)
Moths described in 1903
Taxa named by Karl Jordan
Taxa named by Walter Rothschild